Kuo Chuan Constituency was a constituency in Singapore. It used to exist from 1972 to 1988. Kuo Chuan is home to the Toa Payoh west and the upcoming Bishan New Town, which has been developed since 1988. It was merged into Toa Payoh GRC.

Member of Parliament

Elections

Elections in 1970s

References 

Singaporean electoral divisions
Toa Payoh
Bishan, Singapore